Nikolai Valeryevich Usachyov (born 12 March 1968) is a former Russian football player.

External links
 

1968 births
Footballers from Saint Petersburg
Living people
FC Zenit Saint Petersburg players
Soviet footballers
FC Dynamo Saint Petersburg players
Russian footballers
Russian Premier League players
Association football defenders